Pseudomicrommata (commonly known as grass huntsman spiders) is a genus of huntsman spiders that was first described by T. H. Järvi in 1914.

Species
 it contains four species, found in Africa:
Pseudomicrommata longipes (Bösenberg & Lenz, 1895) (type) – Africa
Pseudomicrommata mary Moradmand, 2015 – Guinea, Ivory Coast
Pseudomicrommata mokranica (Moradmand, Zamani & Jäger, 2019) – Iran
Pseudomicrommata schoemanae Moradmand, 2015 – Cameroon
Pseudomicrommata vittigera (Simon, 1897) – Namibia, South Africa

See also
 List of Sparassidae species

References

Araneomorphae genera
Sparassidae
Spiders of Africa